Dunlap is a census-designated place (CDP) in Elkhart County, Indiana, United States. The population was 6,235 at the 2010 census. Once a small farming community, by the 1980s it had become a suburb of Elkhart and Goshen, Indiana. Most of the town was destroyed by two violent F4 tornadoes during the Palm Sunday Tornado Outbreak on April 11, 1965. Both tornadoes killed over 60 in the region.

History
A post office was established at Dunlap in 1886, and remained in operation until it was discontinued in 1902.

Geography

Demographics

As of the census of 2000, there were 5,887 people, 2,087 households, and 1,657 families residing in the CDP. The racial makeup of the CDP was 91.69% White, 2.87% African American, 0.17% Native American, 0.93% Asian, 0.10% Pacific Islander, 3.04% from other races, and 1.19% from two or more races. Hispanic or Latino of any race were 4.65% of the population.

There were 2,087 households, out of which 37.2% had children under the age of 18 living with them, 66.3% were married couples living together, 9.5% had a female householder with no husband present, and 20.6% were non-families. 16.6% of all households were made up of individuals, and 7.2% had someone living alone who was 65 years of age or older. The average household size was 2.82 and the average family size was 3.16.

In the CDP, the population was spread out, with 28.8% under the age of 18, 7.3% from 18 to 24, 28.1% from 25 to 44, 25.6% from 45 to 64, and 10.1% who were 65 years of age or older. The median age was 37 years. For every 100 females, there were 96.7 males. For every 100 females age 18 and over, there were 91.9 males.

The median income for a household in the CDP was $52,083, and the median income for a family was $55,522. Males had a median income of $40,802 versus $25,500 for females. The per capita income for the CDP was $19,733. About 5.0% of families and 6.1% of the population were below the poverty line, including 8.1% of those under age 18 and 6.4% of those age 65 or over.

Education 
Dunlap is served by Concord Community Schools, including Concord High School.

The community has a public library, a branch of the Elkhart Public Library.

Transportation 
The Interurban Trolley Concord and Elkhart-Goshen routes run through Dunlap, connecting the town to the nearby cities Elkhart and Goshen.

References

Census-designated places in Elkhart County, Indiana
Census-designated places in Indiana